Sir Charles Leolin Forestier-Walker, 1st Baronet,  (6 May 1866 – 13 May 1934) was a Conservative Party politician in the United Kingdom.

Biography
At the 1918 general election, he was elected as Member of Parliament (MP) for Monmouth in Wales and held the seat until his death in 1934, aged 68. At the consequent by-election, the Monmouth seat was held by the Conservatives. In addition to being an MP, he was also a Forestry Commissioner from 1920 to 1929. In 1921 he was also appointed a Mental Health Commissioner, under the terms of the Mental Deficiency Act 1913.

Forestier-Walker was created a baronet (of Rhiwderin in the County of Monmouth) in the Baronetage of the United Kingdom in the 1924 King's Birthday Honours. In the following year's list, he was honoured as a Knight Commander of the Order of the British Empire (KBE). In 1934 he was created a Knight of Justice in the Venerable Order of Saint John.

His daughter Daphne was the mother of Gavin Young, the war correspondent and travel writer.

Notes

References

External links 
 

1866 births
1934 deaths
Conservative Party (UK) MPs for Welsh constituencies
Deputy Lieutenants of Monmouthshire
UK MPs 1918–1922
UK MPs 1922–1923
UK MPs 1923–1924
UK MPs 1924–1929
UK MPs 1929–1931
UK MPs 1931–1935
Knights Commander of the Order of the British Empire
Baronets in the Baronetage of the United Kingdom
Knights of Grace of the Order of St John